Pintosmalto or Pinto Smauto is an Italian literary fairy tale written by Giambattista Basile in his 1634 work, the Pentamerone.

Italo Calvino included a variant from oral tradition, The Handmade King, based on two tales from Calabria.  He noted that variants are also found in Naples, Abruzzo, and Sicily.

It is Aarne-Thompson type 425, the search for the lost bridegroom, in an unusual variation, involving motifs similar to Pygmalion and Galatea.

Translations
Nancy Canepa translated the tale as Splendid Shine and as Pretty as a Picture, although she stated that the literal meaning of the title is "painted enamel".

Synopsis

A merchant's daughter, Betta, continually refused to marry.  One day, he asked her what she wanted him to bring her after a journey.  She asked for large amounts of sugar and sweet almonds, scented water, musk and amber, various jewels, gold thread, and above all a trough and a silver trowel.  Extravagant though it was, he brought it.

She took it and made a statue of it, and prayed to the Goddess of Love, and the statue became a living man.  She took him to her father and told him she wished to marry him.  At the wedding feast, a queen fell in love with Pintosmalto, and because he was still innocent, tricked him into coming with her.  When Betta could not find him, she set out.  An old woman sheltered her for a night and taught her three sayings to use.  Betta went on, and found the city Round Mount, where the queen kept Pintosmalto.  She used the first of the sayings; it conjured up a jeweled coach, and she bribed the queen to let her spend the night at Pintosmalto's door.  The queen drugged Pintosmalto into sleep that night.  Betta's pleadings went unheard.  She used the second; it conjured up a golden cage with a singing bird of jewels and gold, and it went with it as with the coach.

The next day, Pintosmalto went to the garden, and a cobbler who lived nearby and had heard everything told him about the lamenting woman.  Betta used the third saying, which conjured up marvelous clothes, and won her a third night.  Pintosmalto roused at her account of her sufferings and how she had made him; he took everything the queen had taken from Betta, and some jewels and money in recompense for her injuries, and they fled to her father's home.

Variants
In Calvino's version, the heroine is a princess, not a merchant's daughter, the king gives her flour and sugar when she declares she will make her own husband if she wishes to marry, and she brings the hero, King Pepper, to life by singing a charm about how she had done various things for six months to make him.  She is aided on the journey not by an old woman, but by three hermits, who give her nuts to crack; these produce other objects in gold, which she uses in the same manner.

Letterio Di Francia reported a variant from Abruzzi collected by Finamore with the title La favele de Niccasbarre ("The Tale of Niccasbarre"), wherein the artificial husband is created with flour and sugar. The human princess still has to search for her husband, and is gifted fruits on her way there: a chestnut, a walnut, an orange and a lemon.

See also

References

Italian fairy tales
Fiction about shapeshifting
Stories within Italian Folktales
ATU 400-459